was a Japanese samurai of the Sengoku period who served the Imagawa clan. He was the son of Ii Naohira.

Life 
Ii was loyal to Tōtōmi, but he and his father served the daimyō Imagawa Yoshimoto.

References 

Samurai
Year of birth unknown
1545 deaths
Ii clan